Ronen Gabay (born 1965) is a former Israeli footballer who played in Maccabi Netanya throughout most of his career. He now works as the manager of the youth team of Netanya.

He previously worked as the manager of the highly successful youth team of Beitar Nes Tubruk.

On 27 December 2014, Gabay was appointed as the manager of Liga Alef club, Maccabi Kabilio Jaffa. However he left Jaffa after less than one month to become assistant manager at Maccabi Netanya.

On 1 May 2015, Gabay became the assistant manager at Maccabi Haifa.

References

1965 births
Living people
Israeli Jews
Israeli footballers
Maccabi Netanya F.C. players
Maccabi Herzliya F.C. players
Maccabi Jaffa F.C. players
Hapoel Tel Aviv F.C. players
Hapoel Hadera F.C. players
Liga Leumit players
Footballers from Netanya
Israeli people of Moroccan-Jewish descent
Association football midfielders